Sveti Jurij is a settlement in the Municipality of Rogatec in eastern Slovenia. It lies northeast of the town of Rogatec, east of Donačka Gora, and south of Mount Saint Donatus. It is sometimes known as Sveti Jurij pri Donački Gori (literally, Sveti Jurij near Donačka Gora) to differentiate it from other settlements with the same name.  The entire Rogatec area  traditionally belonged to the Styria region. It is now included in the Savinja Statistical Region.

The local church, from which the settlement gets its name, is dedicated to Saint George and belongs to the Parish of Rogatec. It was originally a Late Gothic church, extensively rebuilt in the 17th, 18th, and 19th centuries.

References

External links
Sveti Jurij on Geopedia

Populated places in the Municipality of Rogatec